Nortorfer Land (until 1 January 2007: Nortorf-Land) is an Amt ("collective municipality") in the district of Rendsburg-Eckernförde, in Schleswig-Holstein, Germany. It is situated around the town Nortorf, which is the seat of the Amt.

The Amt Nortorfer Land consists of the following municipalities:

Ämter in Schleswig-Holstein
Nortorf